I Fagiolini is a British vocal ensemble specialising in early music and contemporary music. Founded by Robert Hollingworth at Oxford in 1986, the group won the UK Early Music Network’s Young Artists’ Competition in 1988 and a Royal Philharmonic Society Award in 2006. It has an international reputation for presenting music in unusual ways, especially for featuring in John La Bouchardière's production and film The Full Monteverdi, worldwide. I Fagiolini has recorded some 15 CDs, mostly for Chandos Records, as well as a DVD of Orazio Vecchi's L'Amfiparnaso with Simon Callow.

The group has recorded the recently found Striggio 40-part mass (1566), released in March 2011. The CD won the Early Music category in the 2011 Gramophone Awards and a Diapason d'Or de l'Année.

Frequent guests
Barokksolistene - Period instruments
David Miller - Lute
Catherine Pierron - Harpsichord
Eligio Quinteiro - Lute
Joy Smith Harp

Recent recordings
 Gabrieli, Monteverdi, Palestrina, Viadana: 1612 Italian Vespers (2012) CD Decca Classics 478 3506
 Alessandro Striggio: 40 Part Mass (2011) - CD+DVD Decca Decca Classics 478 2734
 Claudio Monteverdi: Sweet Torment (2009) - CD Chandos CHAN 0760
 Claudio Monteverdi: Fire & Ashes (2008) - CD Chandos CHAN 0749
 Claudio Monteverdi: The Full Monteverdi (2007) - DVD Naxos 2.110224
 Claudio Monteverdi: Flaming Heart (2006) - CD Chandos CHAN 0730
 Orazio Vecchi: L'Amfiparnaso (2004) - DVD Chandos CHDVD 5029

Prizes and awards
Diapason D'Or de L'Année 2011 for Striggio Mass in 40 Parts
Gramophone Early Music Award 2011 for Striggio Mass in 40 Parts 
Choc du Monde de la Musique for The Full Monteverdi (2008)
Royal Philharmonic Society Ensemble of the year (2006)
UK Early Music Network’s Young Artists’ Competition (1988)

References

External links
Official site
Percius
Thefullmonteverdi.co.uk
Chandos Records

Early music choirs
Musical groups established in 1986
British choirs
1986 establishments in the United Kingdom